The Elam School of Fine Arts, founded by John Edward Elam, is part of the Faculty of Creative Arts and Industries at the University of Auckland. Students study degrees in fine art with an emphasis on a multidisciplinary approach. The school is located across three buildings, the Mondrian building, Building 431 (or the "Main" fine arts building), and Elam B, which includes the studios for postgraduate and doctoral students on Princes Street, in central Auckland, New Zealand.

History
The school was founded in 1890 by Elam, and incorporated a School of Design which had been established and maintained for 11 years by Sir Logan Campbell. Edward William Payton was the first director, retiring in 1924 after 35 years. Archie Fisher was appointed principal in 1924 and was instrumental in the school's inclusion within the University of Auckland in 1950. A fire in 1949, which destroyed the school and library, was the catalyst, as well as the loss of pre-1950 administrative records, that resulted in joining with the University.

In 1994, the Sargeson Trust, named after Frank Sargeson, gave the George Fraser Gallery, located in the downstairs premises of a historic stables in Princes St, to the students of Elam for an exhibition space. The Fine Arts Library houses New Zealand's largest collection of specialist monographs, and has an extensive collection of art books, which is believed to be the largest in New Zealand.

Notable staff and alumni

Notable alumni include:

 Gretchen Albrecht 
 Rita Angus 
 George Baloghy
 Don Binney 
 Peter Brown
 Niki Caro
 Stella Corkery
 Bessie Christie
 Noel Crombie 
 Melvin Day
 Lynley Dodd 
 Selina Foote
 Ayesha Green
 Jean Horsley
 Kees Meeuws
 Ellen von Meyern
 Jan Nigro
 Michael Parekowhai
 Ian Scott
 Vida Steinert
 Lois White

Notable staff include:

 Art historian Michael Dunn who was head of the school from 1994 to 2006.
 John Francis Kavanagh
 John Weeks

External links 
Official website
 Elam School of Fine Art, An Encyclopaedia of New Zealand, 1966

References 

Faculties of the University of Auckland
Educational institutions established in 1890
Art schools in New Zealand
1890 establishments in New Zealand